Kalyani is a 1940 Hindi social film directed by Premankur Atorthy.  It was produced by Mansukh Pictures. The music direction was by H. C. Bali. The cast of the film included Rattan Bai, W. M. Khan, Ghulam Mohammed, Jamshedji and Mukhtar.

Cast
Ratan Bai
W. M. Khan
Ghulam Mohomed
Jamshedji
Mukhtar
Sayed Ahmed
Zilloo
Kesar

Songs
Song list
"Aayi Aayi Raat Suhani Aayi"
"Aisa Geet Sunaoon Sajan"
"Dukh Ki Nadiya Jeevan Naiya"
"Hans Lo Hans Lo Jee Bhar Ke Hans Lo"
"Gar Saqi Chala Jaaye Piye Ja Piye Ja"
"Bebas Hai Man Ranj Na Jaye"
"Jeevan Hai Ujadi Phulwadi"
"Keh Rahi Hai Hame Who Ankh Sharmayi Hui"
"Mujhko Bhul Na Jana Pritam"

References

External links

1940 films
1940s Hindi-language films
Films directed by Premankur Atorthy
Indian drama films
1940 drama films
Indian black-and-white films
Hindi-language drama films